The Meadow Valley Mountains is a mountain range in Lincoln and Clark counties in southern Nevada. The Clover Mountains lie to the north, Meadow Valley Wash and the Mormon Mountains to the east, the Moapa Valley to the southeast, Arrow Canyon Range to the south, Coyote Springs Valley to the southwest and the Kane Springs Valley and Delamar Mountains to the west and northwest.

Established in 2004 by the U.S. Congress and managed by the U.S. Bureau of Land Management, the bulk of the range lies within the Meadow Valley Range Wilderness. The wilderness area consists of three major landforms: the long ridgeline of the Meadow Valley Mountains, a large bajada beginning high on the main ridge sloping easterly towards Meadow Valley Wash, and finally the Bunker Hills five miles from the southern section of the central bajada. Conical Sunflower Mountain (elevation ) sits astride the main ridgeline.

References

External links
Meadow Valley Range Wilderness - Friends of Nevada Wilderness
Photos of Meadow Valley Range Wilderness by BLM

Mountain ranges of Nevada
Mountain ranges of Lincoln County, Nevada
Wilderness areas of Nevada